Daulet Shabanbay (born 9 August 1983 in Pavlodar) is a Kazakhstani freestyle wrestler. He competed in the freestyle 120 kg event at the 2012 Summer Olympics and lost the bronze medal match to Bilyal Makhov. He was awarded a bronze in 2019 after the original gold and silver medalists were stripped for failing drug tests.

References

External links
 
 

1993 births
Living people
Kazakhstani male sport wrestlers
Olympic wrestlers of Kazakhstan
Wrestlers at the 2012 Summer Olympics
Wrestlers at the 2016 Summer Olympics
Olympic bronze medalists for Kazakhstan
Olympic medalists in wrestling
Medalists at the 2012 Summer Olympics
People from Pavlodar
Wrestlers at the 2014 Asian Games
Asian Games medalists in wrestling
Asian Games silver medalists for Kazakhstan
Medalists at the 2014 Asian Games
Asian Wrestling Championships medalists
Islamic Solidarity Games medalists in wrestling
Islamic Solidarity Games competitors for Kazakhstan
21st-century Kazakhstani people